Oedudes bifasciata is a species of beetle in the family Cerambycidae. It was described by Henry Walter Bates in 1869. It is known from Panama, Honduras, Costa Rica and Nicaragua.

References

Hemilophini
Beetles described in 1869
Beetles of Central America